Illia Mykolayovych Yemets (born 21 February 1956) is a Ukrainian physician and politician and twice appointed Minister of Healthcare.

Biography 
In 1979, he graduated from the Kyiv Medical Institute with a degree in Pediatrics. Doctor of Medical Sciences, professor.

From 1985 to 2003, Yemets worked as a pediatric heart surgeon and was the head of the department at the Institute of Cardiovascular Surgery of the Academy of Medical Sciences.

In 2003, he was appointed director of the State Institution "Scientific and Practical Medical Center for Pediatric Cardiology and Cardiac Surgery of the Ministry of Healthcare."

From December 2010 to May 2011, Yemets served as Minister of Healthcare.

On 4 March 2020 Yemets was again appointed as Minister of Healthcare. Ukraine's Parliament dismissed him on 30 March 2020.

Honored Doctor of Ukraine. Laureate of the State Prize in Science and Technology.

See also 
 First Azarov government
 Shmyhal Government

References

External links 
 Center for Pediatric Cardiology and Cardiac Surgery

1956 births
Living people
People from Vorkuta
Bogomolets National Medical University alumni
Ukrainian cardiac surgeons
Healthcare ministers of Ukraine
Ukraine – Forward! politicians
21st-century Ukrainian physicians
21st-century Ukrainian politicians
Recipients of the Order of Merit (Ukraine), 1st class
Recipients of the Order of Merit (Ukraine), 2nd class
Recipients of the Order of Merit (Ukraine), 3rd class
Laureates of the State Prize of Ukraine in Science and Technology